St Clare's College is an independent  Roman Catholic single-sex secondary day school for girls, located in Waverley, in the Eastern Suburbs of Sydney, New South Wales, Australia.

Established in 1884 by the Poor Clare Sisters, St Clare's has a non-selective enrolment policy and currently caters for approximately 500 girls from Year 7 to Year 12.

The college is located within the Archdiocese of Sydney, and is affiliated with the Catholic Girls Secondary Schools Sporting Association (CGSSSA) and is a member of the Association of Heads of Independent Girls' Schools (AHIGS).

History
St Clare's College is unique in that it remains established on its original site and continues under the governance of Sydney Catholic schools.

Principals

House system
As with most Australian schools, St Clare's utilises a house system. The school has four houses, through which students compete in a range of sporting and non-sporting activities. They are:
Reid (Brown and Gold)
Claverie (Black and Red)
Deakin (Dark Blue and Light Blue)
Keady (Green and Gold)

The students earn points for their house through participation in these activities, and the house with the most points at the end of the school year is awarded the 'Babicci Shield'. The Babicci is named after Sister Pauline Babicci, former Mother Abbess of the Poor Clares. The colours of the Houses were decided in consultation with the students at the time the House system was devised. The school also features a tutorial program, whereby each student is assigned to a tutorial in their House, in an attempt to win the annual House Babicci Shield.

Notable alumnae
 Anita Heiss Author
 Imelda Roche Co-Chairman of the Roche Group; a former Chancellor of Bond University; Founder of Nutrimetics

See also 

 List of Catholic schools in New South Wales
 Catholic education in Australia

References

External links 
 St Clare's College website 

Girls' schools in New South Wales
Educational institutions established in 1884
Catholic secondary schools in Sydney
Association of Heads of Independent Girls' Schools
Roman Catholic Archdiocese of Sydney
Waverley, New South Wales
1884 establishments in Australia
Alliance of Girls' Schools Australasia